Jennifer Hamson (born January 23, 1992) is an American professional volleyball player and former basketball player. She was also an All-American player for the Brigham Young University Cougars volleyball team.

Early career
Hamson grew up in Lindon, Utah. She attended Pleasant Grove High School, where she was an all-state basketball selection and a member of the state championship volleyball team. She also played for the Utah Elite club volleyball team. Hamson was recruited to play volleyball by the University of Utah, Colorado State, Utah State, Long Beach State, University of Louisville, and UNLV.

College
Hamson was a dual sport athlete at Brigham Young University (BYU) in Provo, Utah, and is considered by many to be the best ever female athlete at BYU. She led the Cougars to a sweet sixteen appearance in the 2014 NCAA tournament, only the third #12 seed to ever make it that far. As a senior, she averaged 18 points, 11 rebounds and led the nation with 147 blocked shots. She was named an Associated Press All-America Honorable Mention recipient and was the WCC Player and Defensive Player of the Year, the first time in league history that the honor has gone to the same student-athlete.

BYU statistics

Source

WNBA career
Following her collegiate career, Hamson was selected 23rd overall (2nd round) in the 2014 WNBA Draft by the Los Angeles Sparks, despite telling teams that she would defer playing a year to complete her volleyball commitments. Hamson signed with the Sparks on February 23, 2015 after sitting out the 2014 WNBA season.

Volleyball career
Hamson chose to defer playing in the WNBA so she could attend the U.S. Collegiate National Volleyball Team camp during the summer of 2014.  She completed her eligibility by competing with the BYU volleyball team for the fall 2014 season. Hamson was named an All American for volleyball after the Cougars run to the Sweet Sixteen in 2013.

After leaving basketball, Hamson returned to playing volleyball, by then also professionally. In November 2018, she was signed by German Women's Volleyball League (Frauen-Volleyball-Bundesliga) club VC Wiesbaden to replace compatriot Holly Toliver. She said, "My love for volleyball has never gone away and I worked hard for a successful start in this great sport. I am very happy and grateful that I will get the chance to prove this at VC Wiesbaden. Also, this is really a beautiful city." Wiesbaden advanced to the DVV-Pokal Frauen (Women's German Cup) and Frauen-Bundesliga quarterfinals in the 2018–19 season but was swept in both by eventual league champions Allianz MTV Stuttgart, to which she signed for the succeeding season. With Hanson, Stuttgart reached the 2020 DVV-Pokal final but lost to Dresdner SC women's volleyball team. At the time the 2019–20 Bundesliga season was curtailed before the playoffs, Stuttgart stood at second place in the table. She eventually parted ways with the club.

Personal life
Hamson is a daughter of David and Tresa Spaulding Hamson, who starred in basketball at BYU, as did many family members on the maternal side. She has two brothers, Alan, who played for the BYU basketball team, and Tim, as well as two sisters.

Awards and honors

Basketball
 WCC player of the year (2014)
 WCC defensive player of the year (2014)

Volleyball
 WCC player of the Year (2013)
 All-WCC First Team (2013)
 All-Pacific Region First Team (2013)
 AVCA All-America First Team (2013)

Career statistics

Brigham Young University

References

External links

1992 births
Living people
American expatriate basketball people in Australia
American expatriate basketball people in Russia
American expatriate sportspeople in Germany
American expatriate volleyball players
American women's basketball players
Basketball players from Utah
BYU Cougars women's basketball players
BYU Cougars women's volleyball players
Centers (basketball)
Expatriate volleyball players in Germany
Los Angeles Sparks draft picks
Los Angeles Sparks players
People from Lindon, Utah
Sydney Uni Flames players